The Oxford Blades were an English ice hockey team based in Oxford, Oxfordshire. They competed in the English Premier Ice Hockey League during the 1998–1999 season and folded halfway through the 1999–2000 season.

The Blades were formed after a year without senior men's hockey in the town. Following the dissolution of the Oxford City Stars, Mike Kellond created the Oxford Chill. Due to the failure of the ice plant at Oxford, Kellond moved the team to Swindon where they became known as the Swindon Chill.

Following a move back to the university-town, the club's concessions from the council for the ice costs were lost along with the majority of its players.

A group of ice hockey-loving businessmen created the Oxford Blades, bringing in former Stars' coach Sid Cabby as managing director in January 1999. Due to a sponsorship deal, the club was known during their debut season as The City Motors FOX Blades. The club's only full season saw them have four head coaches: Geoff Copping got things underway and Erskine Douglas provided a solid structure and programme for a few weeks before leaving for Chelmsford Chieftains. He was replaced by Daryl Morvan and then by late signing Mark Budz. The club lost every game during 1998–1999 and finished at the bottom of the league. However, the club won the sportsmanship trophy for finishing at the top of the fair play league with a total of 386 penalty minutes during the course of the league season.

The 1999–2000 season would prove to be their last, as the club ran out of money and played their last game on 23 January 2000, which saw them lose 16–3 at home to the Isle of Wight Raiders. All league statistics from the season were expunged.

Results

1998–1999 season

1999–2000 season

References

 
 

1998 establishments in England
2000 disestablishments in England
EPIHL teams
Ice hockey clubs established in 1998
Ice hockey teams in England
Sport in Oxford
Sports clubs disestablished in 2000